The 2004 DFS Classic was a women's tennis tournament played on grass courts at the Edgbaston Priory Club in Birmingham in the United Kingdom that was part of Tier III of the 2004 WTA Tour. The tournament was held from 7 June until 13 June 2004. Third-seeded Maria Sharapova won the singles title.

Finals

Singles

 Maria Sharapova defeated  Tatiana Golovin 4–6, 6–2, 6–1
 It was Sharapova's 1st title of the year and the 5th of her career.

Doubles

 Maria Kirilenko /  Maria Sharapova defeated  Lisa McShea /  Milagros Sequera 6–2, 6–1
 It was Kirilenko's only title of the year and the 1st of her career. It was Sharapova's 2nd title of the year and the 6th of her career.

External links
 WTA tournament draws
 ITF tournament edition details

DFS Classic
Birmingham Classic (tennis)
DFS Classic
DFS Classic